John Eldridge may refer to:

 John Eldridge (politician) (1872–1954), Australian politician
 John Eldridge (British Army officer) (1898–1985)
 John Eldridge (sociologist), British sociologist
 John Eldridge Jr. (1903–1942), United States Navy officer
 John Eldridge (director) (1917–1962), British film director

See also
 John Eldredge (born 1960), author and lecturer on Christianity
 John Eldredge (actor) (1904–1961), American actor